The Queen Elizabeth Hospital Birmingham is a major, 1,215 bed, tertiary NHS and military hospital in the Edgbaston area of Birmingham, situated very close to the University of Birmingham. The hospital, which cost £545 million to construct, opened on 16 June 2010, replacing the previous Queen Elizabeth Hospital and Selly Oak Hospital. It is one of the largest single-site hospitals in the United Kingdom and is part of one of the largest teaching trusts in England.

It is named after Queen Elizabeth The Queen Mother, who was queen consort and wife of King George VI from 1936 until his death in 1952.

The hospital provides a whole range of services including secondary services for its local population and regional and national services for the people of the West Midlands and beyond. The hospital has the largest solid organ transplantation programme in Europe. It has the largest renal transplant programme in the United Kingdom and it is a national specialist centre for liver, heart and lung transplantation, as well as cancer studies. The hospital has the largest single-floor critical care unit in the world with 100 beds, and is the home of the Royal Centre for Defence Medicine for military personnel injured in conflict zones.

History

Origins

A variety of charitable hospitals opened in Birmingham between 1817, when the Orthopaedic Hospital opened, and 1881, when the Skin Hospital served its first patients.  One of these, Queens Hospital, established in 1840 by a young local surgeon William Sands Cox, was predominantly for clinical instruction for the medical students of Birmingham.  In 1884 these institutions, including Cox's medical school, united as part of Mason College, which later became the University of Birmingham.

The original Queen Elizabeth Hospital was an NHS hospital in the Edgbaston area of Birmingham situated very close to the University of Birmingham. The building ultimately cost £1,029,057, which was £129,406 less than the money raised by donations.

The new hospital

The new hospital was built adjacent to the old Queen Elizabeth Hospital site. It was built to replace the Queen Elizabeth Hospital and Selly Oak Hospital, although it incorporated some of the newer parts of the old Queen Elizabeth Hospital. It was named the Queen Elizabeth Hospital Birmingham, rather than the originally planned name of Birmingham Queen Elizabeth Hospital, as the Ministry of Justice ruled that no word can precede a Royal Title.

The new hospital was part of a £1 billion urban regeneration plan for Bournbrook and Selly Oak which included the construction of a £350 million retail development and the construction of the Selly Oak bypass. Proposals for the new hospital were unveiled in 1998 and the outline design, which was unveiled in January 2004, was approved by Birmingham City Council in October 2004. It was the first acute hospital to be built in Birmingham since 1937.

The new hospital was procured under a Private Finance Initiative contract with Consort Healthcare signed in early 2006. The hospital was designed by BDP Architects and construction, which was undertaken by Balfour Beatty at a cost of £545 million, began in June 2006. Five Liebherr 280 EC tower cranes were used during construction. Three of the cranes were among the tallest free-standing structures in the UK.

The finished complex comprised three 63-metre-tall towers, each 9 stories tall. A sky-bridge was erected between one of the towers and the retained estate allowing access to the departments of oncology, the pharmacy and the Wellcome Research Centre. As well as providing patient care, provision was made for an education centre and retail outlets.

Services from Selly Oak hospital moved in during the week beginning 16 June 2010, and services from the old Queen Elizabeth Hospital finished moving in November 2011. This allowed simplification of operation due to two hospitals being relocated to one single site, which has the same capacity as the two previous hospitals combined.

The hospital is part of the University Hospitals Birmingham NHS Foundation Trust, one of the largest teaching trusts in the country and a member of the Shelford Group collaboration of the ten largest teaching and research NHS hospital trusts in England. It also hosts the National Institute for Health and Care Research (NIHR) Surgical Reconstruction and Microbiology Research Centre.

Services
The hospital has 1,215 patient beds including capacity for 100 critical care beds – largest single-floor unit in the world. It also has six MRI scanners, five CT scanners, four gamma camera/SPECT-CT systems, eight ultrasound rooms, five fluoroscopy rooms and five interventional radiology suites.

The hospital is the new home of the 'Royal Centre for Defence Medicine', which cares for injured service men and women from conflict zones, as well as training Army, Navy and Air Force medical staff.

Notable patients 

Those reported to have been treated there include:
 Schoolgirl and education activist Malala Yousafzai was flown in from Pakistan to receive treatment at the hospital after being shot in the head by the Taliban in an incident which she earned plaudits across the world for her bravery and determination in recovery.
 Stephen Sutton, who raised millions of pounds for the Teenage Cancer Trust, died aged 19 from colon cancer at the hospital on 19 May 2014.

Notable incidents 

A nurse at the hospital was suspended from the medical register in 2013 when a panel at the Nursing and Midwifery Council proved more than 70 charges of incompetency.

A surgeon used an argon beam machine to write his initials on the organs of the anaesthetised patients in 2013.

In 2016 the death rate among patients receiving cardiac surgery was found to be above average for the nation.  Among other criticisms it was suggested a bullying culture has prevented staff voicing concerns.

Performance
As of October 2021 the Care Quality Commission rated the Queen Elizabeth Hospital overall as "requires improvement".

See also
 Babatunde Kwaku Adadevoh
 Healthcare in West Midlands
 Birmingham Women's Hospital - Located adjacent to the hospital
 List of hospitals in England

References

External links

 University Hospital Birmingham NHS Foundation Trust
 NIHR Surgical Reconstruction and Microbiology Research Centre

Hospital buildings completed in 2010
Hospitals in Birmingham, West Midlands
Military hospitals in the United Kingdom
NHS hospitals in England
Teaching hospitals in England